Boldumsaz District   is a district of Daşoguz Province, Turkmenistan. The administrative center of the district is the town of Boldumsaz.

Districts of Turkmenistan
Daşoguz Region